Lieutenant General Abhay Krishna, PVSM, UYSM, AVSM, SM, VSM, ADC is a retired officer of Indian Army. He served as General Officer-Commanding-in-Chief (GOC-in-C), Central Command from 1 October 2018 following the retirement of Lieutenant General Balwant Singh Negi, to 30 September 2019. He was succeeded by Lieutenant General Iqroop Singh Ghuman. Prior to that, he commanded the Eastern Command and South Western Command of the Indian Army

Early life and education 
Krishna is an alumnus of St Xavier's High School, Patna; National Defence Academy, Khadakwasla and Indian Military Academy, Dehradun.

Career 
Krishna was commissioned into Rajputana Rifles on 7 June 1980. He has vast experience and has served four tenures along Line of Actual Control, two tenures as UN observer, in Mozambique & Rwanda and as Chief of Staff (UN forces) in Burundi. He has commanded a Rashtriya Rifles Battalion in the Kashmir valley, an infantry battalion in Sikkim, Brigadier General Staff 3 Corps, 27 Mountain division (Kalimpong), Chief of Staff (Delhi area) and GOC III Corps (Dimapur). He has served as GOC-in-C of the South Western Command (25 January 2017 - 30 July 2017) and GOC-in-C of Eastern Command (1 August 2017 - 30 September 2018). He commanded the RR during Operation Hifazat (Manipur) and Operation Rakshak (Kupwara).

Honours and decorations 
During 39 years of his career, he has won a gallantry award in 1994 for being taken hostage, negotiating for release of other hostages and demobilisation of rebel forces during UN Peace Keeping Mission in Mozambique. He has also been awarded a Vishisht Sena Medal, Sena Medal, Ati Vishisht Seva Medal in 2014, Uttam Yudh Seva Medal in 2017 and Param Vishisht Seva Medal in 2018. He was also the Colonel of the Regiment Rajputana Rifles and was Second-in-Command for the Republic Day parade in 2015.

Dates of rank

References 

Living people
Indian generals
Recipients of the Uttam Yudh Seva Medal
Recipients of the Ati Vishisht Seva Medal
Recipients of the Vishisht Seva Medal
National Defence Academy (India) alumni
Recipients of the Sena Medal
Recipients of the Param Vishisht Seva Medal
Year of birth missing (living people)